Jos Vaessen (born 21 March 1944) was president of the football team KRC Genk from 2001 until 2006 and founder of the company Vasco.

References

1944 births
Living people
K.R.C. Genk managers
People from Dilsen-Stokkem
Belgian football managers
Sportspeople from Limburg (Belgium)